Myocyte-specific enhancer factor 2C also known as MADS box transcription enhancer factor 2, polypeptide C is a protein that in humans is encoded by the MEF2C gene. MEF2C is a transcription factor in the Mef2 family.

Genomics 

The gene is located at 5q14.3 on the minus (Crick) strand and is 200,723 bases in length. The encoded protein has 473 amino acids with a predicted molecular weight of 51.221 kiloDaltons. Three isoforms have been identified. Several post translational modifications have been identified including phosphorylation on serine-59 and serine-396, sumoylation on lysine-391, acetylation on lysine-4 and proteolytic cleavage.

Interactions 

MEF2C has been shown to interact with:

 EP300, 
 HDAC4, HDAC7, HDAC9,
 MAPK7, 
 SOX18
 SP1,  and
 TEAD1. 

 SETD1A

Biological significance

This gene is involved in cardiac morphogenesis and myogenesis and vascular development. It may also be involved in neurogenesis and in the development of cortical architecture. Mice without a functional copy of the Mef2c gene die before birth and have abnormalities in the heart and vascular system. It is one of the targets of an oncomiR, MIRN21.

In humans mutations of this gene result in autosomal dominant mental retardation 20 (MRD20), characterised by severe psychomotor impairment, periodic tremor and an abnormal motor pattern with mirror movement of the upper limbs observed during infancy, hypotonia, abnormal EEG, epilepsy, absence of speech, autistic behavior, bruxism, and mild dysmorphic features, mild thinning of the corpus callosum and delay of white matter myelination in the occipital lobes

MEF2C-binding site is associated with minor allele of SNP rs630923, associated with the risk of multiple sclerosis, and responsible for reduced CXCR5 gene promoter activity in B-cells during activation, that could lead to decreased autoimmune response

See also 
 Mef2

References

Further reading

External links 
 
 

Transcription factors